The launch history of NASA's Launch Services Program (LSP) since the program formed in 1998 at Kennedy Space Center. The launch of NASA robotic missions occurred from a number of launch sites on a variety of rockets. After the list of launches are descriptions of select historic LSP missions.

Launch history

The table below is a complete history of the NASA robotic spacecraft launched by the Launch Services Program The dates are relative to the launch site and may not match the UTC date.

1990s

2000-2004

2005-2009

2010s

2020s

ElaNa launches

Historic missions
Below are descriptions of historic NASA missions launched by the Launch Services Program.

Mars Exploration Rovers (MER-A & B) (Delta II)

NASA's Mars Exploration Rovers launched aboard Delta II vehicles from CCAFS. MER-A "Spirit" launched June 2003, and MER-B "Opportunity" launched July 7 that same year. Both rovers reached Mars in January 2004. Information sent back to Earth from the rovers revealed the existence of water in the Red Planet's past (now ice). Previous missions to Mars include the 2001 Mars Odyssey spacecraft that launched in 2001.

The Mars Pathfinder began its journey as NASA's first return to Mars after the Viking mission began with the launch of the Mars Global Surveyor in 1996, scheduled to last two years. The Surveyor traveled to the Red Planet and spent about two years mapping the Martian surface to achieve a global portrait then continued to work, so NASA extended its mission and used it as a communications satellite to relay data from the Mars Odyssey as well as the Spirit and Opportunity twins back to Earth.

Kepler, Deep Impact, MESSENGER (Delta II)

The Kepler mission, the 10th in NASA's Discovery missions, launched on a Delta II rocket, in 2009. The Kepler telescope was specifically designed to survey a portion of the region of the Milky Way galaxy for about three and a half years to discover dozens of Earth-size planets in or near the habitable zone and determine how many of the billions of stars in the galaxy have such planets. The mission could be extended to six years.

The Deep Impact mission launched in 2005 and reached Comet Tempel 1 in July 2005. The "fly-by" spacecraft collected images of the comet before its "impactor" spacecraft reached the comet, and after the impact to study the pristine interior of one of its craters.

NASA's Mercury Surface, Space, Environment, Geochemistry, and Ranging (MESSENGER) spacecraft launched aboard a Delta II rocket in August 2004. The spacecraft made the 4.9-billion-mile trek to Mercury, with 15 trips around the sun and flybys of the Earth and Venus along the way. The spacecraft reached Mercury in 2008, with flybys of that planet in January and October, and again in September 2009. MESSENGER is only the second spacecraft sent to Mercury, but the first one to orbit Mercury.

New Horizons (Atlas V)

In 2006, NASA dispatched an ambassador to the planetary frontier. The New Horizons spacecraft is now halfway between Earth and Pluto, on approach for a dramatic flight past the icy planet and its moons in July 2015. After 10 years and more than 3 billion miles, on a historic voyage that has already taken it over the storms and around the moons of Jupiter, New Horizons will shed light on new kinds of worlds we've only just discovered on the outskirts of the solar system.

Pluto gets closer by the day, and New Horizons continues into rare territory, as just the fifth probe to traverse interplanetary space so far from the Sun. And the first to travel so far, to reach a new planet for exploration.

GOES and TDRS Fleet of Satellites (Atlas II)

NASA used the Atlas II to launch the National Oceanic and Atmospheric Administration (NOAA) Geostationary Operational Environmental Satellite (GOES) weather satellites, and some of the Tracking and Data Relay Satellite (TDRS) communications series of satellites into orbit. GOES-M lifted off in 2001 aboard an Atlas IIA. It was the fifth spacecraft to be launched in the current advanced series of environmental satellites for NOAA and the first to have a solar X-ray imager. The most recent TDRS launch was in January 2013 (TDRS-K) from CCAFS.

Kodiak Star (Athena I) & Lunar Prospector (Athena II)

The Athena I vehicle carried NASA's Kodiak Star mission into orbit Sept. 29, 2001, from the Kodiak Launch Complex in Alaska. NASA's Starshine 3 and three U.S. Department of Defense satellites were launched into different orbits. Starshine 3 provided data on satellite orbit decay.

The first successful launch of an Athena II carried NASA's Lunar Prospector spacecraft on a mission to search for traces of water or ice on the moon.

Terra (Atlas IIAS)

NASA launched the Earth Observing System's flagship satellite "Terra," named for Earth, in 1999. Terra has been collecting data about the changes in Earth's climate brought on by global warming. Terra carries five state-of-the-art sensors that have been studying the interactions among the Earth's atmosphere, lands, oceans, and radiant energy. Each sensor has unique design features that will enable scientists to meet a wide range of science objectives.

Stardust, Genesis (Delta II)

On Feb. 7, 1999, a Delta II launched from Launch Complex 17-A at CCAFS carrying the Stardust spacecraft. Stardust collected comet dust and volatile samples during a planned close encounter with the comet Wild 2 in January 2004. Stardust also collected samples of interstellar dust, including the recently discovered dust streaming into our Solar System. This launch was unusual in that it was the first U.S. mission dedicated solely to the study of a comet.

NASA's Genesis spacecraft launched aboard a Delta II Aug. 8, 2001, from Launch Complex 17-A at CCAFS. Genesis collected samples of solar wind — invisible, charged particles that flow outward from the Sun. The particles will be studied by scientists to search for answers to fundamental questions about the exact composition of our star and the birth of our Solar System.

Solar and Heliospheric Observatory (SOHO) (Atlas IIAS)

The SOHO spacecraft, a joint venture between NASA and the European Space Agency, was launched aboard an Atlas IIAS Dec. 2, 1995, from Space Launch Complex 36 at CCAFS. The SOHO spacecraft, which was launched Dec. 2, 1995, aboard an Atlas rocket, gathered data to study the internal structure of the Sun, its extensive outer atmosphere and the origin of solar wind, as well as the stream of highly ionized gas that blows continuously through the Solar System. The information SOHO provided helped scientists better understand the interactions between the Sun and the Earth's environment.

References

Launch Services Program list of launches
Launch Services Program